Kamalabad-e Bala (also Romanized as Kamālābād-e Bālā; also known as Kamālābād-e ‘Olyā) is a village in Mashhad-e Miqan Rural District, in the Central District of Arak County, Markazi Province, Iran. At the 2006 census, its population was 50, in 16 families.

References 

Populated places in Arak County